John Fitzgerald (born 10 February 1984) is an Irish footballer.

Fitzgerald started his career with Park Celtic. He later moved to St. Josephs Boys and then Blackburn Rovers. He represented Republic of Ireland Under-20 team at the 2003 FIFA World Youth Championship.
He joined Galway United from Bury.

Fitzgerald captained Galway United on several occasions.

References

External links
 https://web.archive.org/web/20071118191752/http://www.galwayunitedfc.ie/first-team-squad/john-fitzgerald.html

Living people
1984 births
Blackburn Rovers F.C. players
Bury F.C. players
Galway United F.C. (1937–2011) players
League of Ireland players
Republic of Ireland association footballers
Sportspeople from Dún Laoghaire–Rathdown
Melbourne Knights FC players
Republic of Ireland under-21 international footballers
Republic of Ireland youth international footballers
Association football defenders